Maurizio Vitali (born 17 March 1957) was an Italian Grand Prix motorcycle road racer. His best year was in 1984 when he finished fourth in the 125cc world championship. 
He is part of Valentino Rossi's team.

References 

1957 births
Living people
Italian motorcycle racers
125cc World Championship riders
250cc World Championship riders